Gäbris is a mountain of the Appenzell Alps, overlooking Gais in the canton of Appenzell Ausserrhoden.

References

External links
Gäbris on Hikr

Mountains of Switzerland
Mountains of the Alps
Mountains of Appenzell Ausserrhoden
Appenzell Alps
One-thousanders of Switzerland